Endocapillary proliferative glomerulonephritis is a form of glomerulonephritis that can be associated with nephritis.

It may be associated with Parvovirus B19.

References

Further reading

External links 

Glomerular diseases
Kidney diseases